On 21-23 July 2022, an election was held indirectly to elect the President of Vanuatu.

Incumbent President Tallis Obed Moses was eligible for a second term. The election was won on the eighth round of voting on 23 July by Nikenike Vurobaravu.

Candidates 

 Tallis Obed Moses, Incumbent President of Vanuatu since 6 July 2017 (b. 1954), Independent
 Nikenike Vurobaravu, Vanuatu High Commissioner to Fiji, Vanua'aku Pati
 Edwin Amblus, former member of Parliament (2016–2020), Friend Melanesian Party
 John Korwar Path, former Auditor General
 Jacob Bani, Independent
 Willie Jimmy Tapangararua, former member of Parliament (1983–2008, 2012–2016), Vanuatu Liberal Democratic Party
 Andrina Thomas, activist, Leleon Vanua Democratic Party
 Serge Vohor, former Prime Minister (1995–1996, 1996–1998, 2004, 2011), Union of Moderate Parties
 Malao John Vimoli, Independent
 Lois Kwevira Natuhihe Fatu, Independent
 George Andre Wells, former member of Parliament (1995–2016), former Speaker of Parliament (2008–2009, 2010, 2012–2013), People's Progressive Party
 Jude Iath Salro Naru, Independent
 Sela Molisa, former member of Parliament (1982–2012), Vanua'aku Pati

Declined 
 Bob Loughman, Incumbent Prime Minister of Vanuatu since 20 April 2020 (b. 1961), Vanua'aku Pati

Results

21 July rounds

22 July rounds

23 July rounds

References

Presidential election
Vanuatu
July 2022 events in Oceania
Presidential elections in Vanuatu